Theo Harych (19 December 1903 – 22 February 1958) was a German writer.

Life
Born in Doruchow, Province of Posen, Theo Harych was the son of a farmer.  From 1910 to 1918, he worked as a herder and servant in Silesia.  He stopped attending a Volksschule after 1916.  He went to Central Germany in 1919 where he worked in a sugar factory and in a coal mine in Mücheln.  As a member of the Miner's Labor Union, he participated in the Mitteldeutschen Aufstand (Central German Rebellion) in the Gieseltal (Giesel Valley).  He attended a driving and servant school in Halle (Saale), subsequently he was a journeyman in Saxony on the way.  He was once employed as a valet to an Adel but lasted just five minutes, on account of his Communist sentiments.  He followed with renewed travel and spent time as a driver in Berlin.  After a period of unemployment from 1930 to 1936, Harych worked as a locksmith from 1936 to 1944.  He drove deliveries with one of his own panel vans.  He was drafted to the Wehrmacht in 1944 but fared poorly because of ear problems.  He was assigned to "Ear Company" and soon released.

After World War II, he worked again as a valet, in East Berlin.  His writing talent was discovered in 1950 and enabled him an existence as a freelance writer.  Harych was a member of the Deutscher Schriftstellerverband and received the 1954 Heinrich Mann Prize.  He committed suicide in Berlin in 1958.

In addition to a children's book, Theo Harych published three novels.  Hinter den schwartzen Wäldern (Behind the Black Forests) describes Harych's poor childhood.  Themes of In Geiseltal are misery and rebellion in the Central German coal mines until the insurrection of 1921.  The third novel, Im Namen des Volkes (In the Name of the People), is a documentary of miscarriage of justice befalling Polish farm worker Jakubowski in the 1920s.

Works
Hinter den schwarzen Wäldern (Behind the Black Forests), Berlin 1951
Bärbels und Lothars schönster Tag (Bärbel and Lothar's Beautiful Day), Berlin 1952
Im Geiseltal (In Geisel Valley), Berlin 1952
Im Namen des Volkes? (In the Name of the People), Berlin 1958

Literature
Serke, J.: Zu Hause im Exil (To the House in Exile). München, Zürich 1998

External links
 Wer was wer in der DDR? Harych Theo (Who was who in East Germany? Theo Harych) 

1903 births
1958 deaths
People from Ostrzeszów County
People from the Province of Posen
People from East Berlin
Heinrich Mann Prize winners
German male writers
1958 suicides
Suicides in East Germany